The second-generation Seoul Metro 2000-series is a South Korean electrical multiple unit train manufactured by Hyundai Rotem and Dawonsys since 2005 for Seoul Metro, operating on Seoul Subway Line 2.

History
In 2004, Seoul Metro ordered a first batch comprising 5 ten-car trains (2-01~2-05) and 1 four-car unit (2-57) from Hyundai Rotem. The trains were delivered in 2005 and replaced aging 1st generation 2000-series trains.

In 2006, Seoul Metro ordered a second batch comprising 29 ten-car trains (2-15~2-31 and 2-61~2-72) and three four-car trains (2-58~2-60) from Hyundai Rotem. The trains were delivered from 2007 to 2008 and replaced aging 1st generation 2000-series trains. Trains 2-23~2-31 and 2-71~2-72 use newer unpowered 1st generation 2000-series cars built between 1991 and 1992, which were retrofitted with technology found in the newer trains.

In 2015, Seoul Metro ordered a third batch comprising 20 ten-car trains (2-06~2-13, 2-39~2-42, 2-85~2-92) from Dawonsys. The design of the carbody changed somewhat. The trains were delivered from 2017 to 2018 and replaced aging 1st generation 2000-series trains and 2nd batch standardized wide-width trains.

In 2017, Seoul Metro ordered a fourth batch comprising 21 ten-car trains (2-14, 2-32~2-38, 2-73~2-84) and one four-car train (2-56) from Hyundai Rotem. The design of the carbody changed once again, and was revealed in July 2018. The trains were delivered from 2019 to 2020 and replaced aging 1st generation 2000-series trains, rebuilt trains formed from newer 1st generation 2000-series cars, and 2nd batch standardized wide-width trains.

In 2018, Seoul Metro ordered a fifth batch comprising four six-car trains (2-45~2-48) and 22 unpowered non-driving cars was placed with Dawonsys. The design of the carbody is identical to that of the third batch trains. The trains are planned to be delivered in 2021. The six-car trains will replace aging rebuilt trains formed from newer 1st generation 2000-series cars, while the 22 unpowered cars will replace the newer 1st generation 2000-series cars in second batch trains.

Fleet List

, the fleet is as follows:

Gallery

See also

 Rail transport in South Korea

References

Seoul Subway Line 2
Seoul Metropolitan Subway
Rolling stock of South Korea
Electric multiple units of South Korea
1500 V DC multiple units
Hyundai Rotem multiple units